William Richard Ladsey Gibbes (1880 – 21 November 1918) was a New Zealand cricketer who played 14 first-class matches for Wellington between 1905 and 1915.

A batsman and occasional bowler, Gibbes had his best season in 1911–12, when he was the leading batsman in New Zealand, scoring 353 runs at an average of 58.83. He reached 50 five times in his seven innings that season, with a top score of 81 against Auckland, which was also the highest score in the match, which Auckland won by one wicket. He was particularly successful as an opening batsman for the East club in Wellington senior cricket.

He worked as a clerk for Townsend and Paul, auctioneers and produce merchants of Wellington. He died in the 1918 flu pandemic, leaving a widow and a son.

References

External links 
 William Gibbes at Cricinfo
 William Gibbes at CricketArchive

1880 births
1918 deaths
People from Cootamundra
Australian emigrants to New Zealand
New Zealand cricketers
Wellington cricketers
Deaths from Spanish flu
Cricketers from New South Wales